Mudcat may refer to:

Sports teams
 Carolina Mudcats, a minor league baseball team in North Carolina, U.S., U.S.
 Columbus Mudcats, were a Minor League Baseball team in Georgia
 Dunnville Jr. Mudcats, a Junior ice hockey team in Dunnville, Ontario, Canada
 Topeka Mudcats, a women's professional American football team in Kansas, U.S.

Other use
 Flathead catfish, also called mudcat
 Mudcat Café, a folk music website
 Mudcat Grant (1935–2021), American baseball player
 David Saunders (political strategist), American political consultant nicknamed Mudcat